Swarsen Nunatak is a conspicuous nunatak, largely snow-covered, located 5 nautical miles (9 km) southwest of Mount Jackson in Palmer Land. Mapped by United States Geological Survey (USGS) in 1974. Named by Advisory Committee on Antarctic Names (US-ACAN) for Lieutenant Commander Ronald J. Swarsen, U.S. Navy Reserve, Medical Officer at Byrd Station, 1971, and at the South Pole Station, 1973.

Nunataks of Palmer Land